Asian Highway 44 or AH44 is a route of the Sri Lankan highway network, running  from Dambulla in Central Province to Trincomalee in Eastern Province. This route is composed of A6 Highway.

Route 
AH44 runs across three provinces of Sri Lanka and it is composed of only A6 Highway. The route is in three segments on A6.

 Dambulla - Habarana : 
 Habarana - Kantale  :  
 Kantale  - Trincomalee :

Junctions
  at Dambulla

See also
 AH43
 List of Asian Highways

References

External links
 Treaty on Asian Highways with routes

Asian Highway Network
Roads in Sri Lanka